Krzysztof Grzegorek (born 15 September 1946) is a Polish former fencer. He competed in the team sabre event at the 1972 Summer Olympics.

References

1946 births
Living people
Polish male fencers
Olympic fencers of Poland
Fencers at the 1972 Summer Olympics
People from Koło County
Sportspeople from Greater Poland Voivodeship